Murray Krug (born 30 April 1972) is a South African cricketer. He played in twelve first-class matches from 1992/93 to 1995/96.

References

External links
 

1972 births
Living people
South African cricketers
Border cricketers
Northerns cricketers
Cricketers from East London, Eastern Cape